Iván Vargas (born 5 June 1991) is a Paraguayan football left midfielder. He currently plays for Club Rubio Ñu.

International career
Vargas was one of the best players for the Paraguay national under-20 football team at the 2011 South American Youth Championship, where Paraguay finished in second place.

External links

Paraguayan footballers
1991 births
Living people
Association football midfielders
Paraguay international footballers
Club Rubio Ñu footballers